Amaya Paulina Alvez Marín (born 3 April 1971) is a Chilean lawyer who was elected as a member of the Chilean Constitutional Convention.

References

External links
 BCN Profile

Living people
Chilean women lawyers
21st-century Chilean politicians
Democratic Revolution politicians
University of Concepción alumni
York University alumni
Members of the Chilean Constitutional Convention
21st-century Chilean women politicians
1971 births
20th-century Chilean lawyers
21st-century Chilean lawyers